Aging out is American popular culture vernacular used to describe anytime a youth leaves a formal system of care designed to provide services below a certain age level.

There are a variety of applications of the phrase throughout the youth development field. In respect to foster care, aging out is the process of a youth transitioning from the formal control of the foster care system towards independent living. It is used to describe anytime a foster youth leaves the varying factors of foster care, including home, school and financial systems. The United States Citizenship and Immigration Services defines an "aging out" case as, "a situation referring to a person's petition to become a permanent legal resident as a child, and in the time that passes during the processing of the application, the child turns 18 and ages out.".

Usage
Often used to highlight the problems traditional foster care approaches face, aging out affects foster youth in a variety of ways. An estimated 30,000 adolescents age out of the foster care system each year in the United States.

Aging out is also used in reference to Drum Corps International's rules, which state that drum corps' members above the age of 18-to-21 are denied the ability to compete in World Class.

Former foster youth in education 
Children who grow up in foster care have lower rates of high school and post-secondary education completion. Using the PRISMA methodology (Preferred Reporting Items for Systematic Reviews and Meta-Analyses), Gypen et al. (2017) systematically gathered published research articles from electronic databases such as PsycINFO, Springer, Science Direct, and Google Scholar. Their comprehensive review included articles under the terms "Foster care" or "Foster alumni" or "foster children" and "long-term perspectives" or "long-term results". The studies included participants aged 17 years and older (no age cap) gathering data from family service systems and child protective systems.

Dworsky and Courtney (2009) found that in child protective systems, only 64% had completed high school by the age of 19 and Pecora, Williams et al. (2006) found that by the age of 29, 85% had completed high school or completed a GED. The family service systems showed that 45% of foster students completed high school. Compared to the general population of 73%, this is considerably low. By the age of 23, that number increased to 73%, which is closer to the 83% of students not in foster care. Jackson and Cameron (2012) found similar findings. By the age of 18 only 33% had a high school diploma and by the age of 24, that number grew to 73%. Gypen et al. (2017) suggests that this means that if given more time, children who grew in foster care, have a higher chance of getting a high school diploma or GED.

When it comes to higher education, research shows that the number of students completing a two year, four year, or masters program to be even lower than high school completion rates.  They also found that during the first year of college, children who age out of foster care were two times more likely to drop out, although there are indications that women have better outcomes than men (Naccarato et al. 2010). Pecora, Williams et al. (2006) found that 42.7% started education after high school but by the age of 25, only 9.6% were still  enrolled. For those in the family service system, only 7.2% completed their bachelor’s and by the age of 23, only 1% had a Master's degree.

Naccarato et al. (2010) suggested a buddy system to help foster students through their educational journey, just like families provide similar support systems for those students not in foster care.

Statistics
The Child Welfare League of America reports that as many as 36% of foster youth who have aged out of the system become homeless, 56% become unemployed, and 27% of male former foster youth become jailed. The San Francisco Chronicle reports that less than half of emancipated youth who have aged out graduate from high school, compared to 85% of all 18- to 24-year-olds; fewer than 1 in 8 graduate from a four-year college; two-thirds had not maintained employment for a year; fewer than 1 in 5 was completely self-supporting; more than a quarter of the males spent time in jail; and 4 of 10 had become parents as a result of an unplanned pregnancy.

Responses
In 1970, Title X of the Public Health Service Act started providing for the federal family planning program, designed to provide resources for health services and counseling to low-income or uninsured individuals who may otherwise lack access to health care, including young people aging out of foster care. The United States Department of Housing and Urban Development's Family Unification Program provides Housing Choice Vouchers to young people aging out of the foster care system.

The Administration for Children's Services, and the federal Office of Housing Policy and Development, in cooperation with the New York City Housing Authority, has a Section 8 Priority Code for young people aging out of the foster care system.

In 1999, President Clinton signed the Foster Care Independence Act, which doubled federal funding for independent living programs and provides funding for drug abuse prevention and health insurance for former foster care youth until age 21.

Now programs and laws, such as the Chafee Foster Care Independence Program, are starting to make headway into ways to compensate foster children who have become adults. $140 million is to be funded for this program, including states matching 20%.

See also
 Elevate (organization)

References

External links
 IMDB Page for Aging Out Documentary
  "The Original Foster Care Survival Guide" website. Presents the wisdom and knowledge needed to successfully transition from foster care to adulthood. Written by an attorney that was in foster care.

Foster care
Youth
Family
English phrases
Ageism